Schönebeck-Felgeleben station is a railway station in the Felgeleben district in the municipality of Schönebeck (Elbe), located in the Salzlandkreis district in Saxony-Anhalt, Germany.

References

Railway stations in Saxony-Anhalt
Buildings and structures in Salzlandkreis